Sam Hendriks (born 25 January 1995) is a Dutch professional footballer who plays as a striker for Cypriot club Olympiakos Nicosia.

Club career

De Graafschap
Born in Doetinchem, Hendriks began his football career with local amateur side VV VIOD, before transferring to De Graafschap in 2005. Hendriks made his debut as an 88th-minute substitute for Anco Jansen against Telstar in the Eerste Divisie on 26 April 2013. Sidelined by a knee injury for the majority of the 2012–13 season, Hendriks only made one appearance for the first team.

Ajax
On 24 June 2013, Hendriks signed a four-year contract with Ajax. Hendriks made his debut for the reserves team Jong Ajax in a 2–0 Eerste Divisie loss to FC Oss on 16 August 2013. He came on for Marvin Höner in the 70th minute, playing as a striker. On 20 August 2013, Hendriks scored four goals for Jong Ajax in a 15–0 friendly match win over Tweede Klasse side RKSV Nemelaer. He scored his first professional career goal in the 22nd minute of a 1–2 loss to former club De Graafschap in the Eerste Divisie on 11 November 2013.

Go Ahead Eagles
On 15 June 2016, it was announced that Hendriks had signed a three-year deal with Go Ahead Eagles, leaving Ajax on a free transfer.

Return to Cambuur
On 15 June 2021, Hendriks returns to SC Cambuur. On 28 January 2022, Hendriks was loaned to De Graafschap for the rest of the season.

Olympiakos Nicosia
On 26 August 2022, he signed for Cypriot club Olympiakos Nicosia.

International career
Hendriks made his international debut for the Netherlands national under-15 team in a friendly match against Turkey on 8 December 2009. The match ended in a 4–1 win for the Netherlands. He scored his only goal in his final appearance for the U-15 team against Republic of Ireland in a 2–1 friendly match win. On 4 February 2011, he appeared in all three matches for the U-16 team in the 2011 International Youth Tournament in Portugal, making his debut against the hosts in a 2–0 win, playing in the 4–1 win over Israel two days later, followed by a 1–1 draw with Italy. On 26 March 2013, Hendrik was called up by U-18 coach Remy Reijnierse for the international friendly match against Germany on 26 March 2013. The match ended in a 4–1 victory for the Dutch. On 29 August, Hendriks was selected for the Netherlands U-19 team to face Germany in a friendly match. He made his U-19 debut on 6 September 2013 in a 6–1 loss to the Germans.

Career statistics

References

External links
 Netherlands U16 stats at OnsOranje
 Netherlands U21 stats at OnsOranje
 

1995 births
Living people
People from Doetinchem
Dutch footballers
Association football forwards
Eredivisie players
Eerste Divisie players
De Graafschap players
AFC Ajax players
Jong Ajax players
Go Ahead Eagles players
SC Cambuur players
Olympiakos Nicosia players
Challenger Pro League players
Oud-Heverlee Leuven players
Dutch expatriate footballers
Dutch expatriate sportspeople in Belgium
Expatriate footballers in Belgium
Dutch expatriate sportspeople in Cyprus
Expatriate footballers in Cyprus
Netherlands under-21 international footballers
Netherlands youth international footballers
Footballers from Gelderland